Haxby railway station was a minor railway station serving the town of Haxby in the City of York, England. Located on the York to Scarborough Line it was opened on 5 July 1845 by the York and North Midland Railway. The Y&NMR became part of the North Eastern Railway in 1854 which in turn became part of the London and North Eastern Railway in 1923. It closed on 22 September 1930.

Bradshaws timetable for summer 1927 showed 15 trains in each direction on a weekday with two services on a Sunday. Trains operated between York and Flaxton railway station and a number of these were operated by a bus mounted on rail wheels.

The initial rail bus was first put into service in 1922 and was based on the road buses operated by the North Eastern Railway (NER) in the Durham area. An additional driving position was fitted to the back and additional doors were fitted in the centre of the bus. The bus could seat 26 passengers and was initially numbered 110. This conflicted with another NER carriage number and was subsequently renumbered to Y130. In July 1923 Y130 was moved to Selby and a new rail motor (number 2130) started work. It was renumbered 22105 in August 1926 and worked the service until increasing bus competition killed off the station (although freight services lasted until 1964). 22105 moved to Hull and was withdrawn in 1934. These two vehicles were predecessors of the many Diesel Multiple Units that proliferate on Britain's railways.

The York to Scarborough line generally sees an hourly service operated by TransPennine Express services formed of Class 185 Diesel Multiple Unit trains. A number of steam specials use the line during the year.

Reopening
There has been talk of reopening a station at Haxby since the 1980s as the town has grown and to help reduce road congestion into York including around York station. The reopening plan was approved by York City Council in 1997 and was part of the 2001 local transport plan. The plans continued to be shelved for a number of reasons, but Network Rail said in 2006 that it would provisionally support the reopening of this station. Funding for re-opening the station was announced in early 2009, with a target date for opening in January 2013, but the plans were put on hold in June 2010 until the amount of public money necessary for the works can be clarified.

The possibility of re-opening Haxby station was revived by an announcement by City of York Council along with several of other transport related schemes in September 2012. The New Stations Study by West Yorkshire Metro in 2014 recommended further study of the site, and the City of York Council estimated that 22,000 people lived within  of the proposed station.

In 2020, it was announced that the government would provide funding for further studies into the reopening of the station, and in early 2021, York City Council bought  of land beside the proposed new station's location.

In November 2020 it was announced that Haxby station had been successful in its application for money from the New Stations Fund.

References

External links

 Haxby station on navigable 1947 O. S. map

Disused railway stations in North Yorkshire
Grade II listed buildings in York
Former York and North Midland Railway stations
Railway stations in Great Britain opened in 1845
Railway stations in Great Britain closed in 1930
Proposed railway stations in England
George Townsend Andrews railway stations